Philip Carey (born Eugene Joseph Carey, July 15, 1925February 6, 2009) was an American actor.

Early life and education
On July 15, 1925, Carey was born in Hackensack, New Jersey. He grew up in Rosedale, Queens and Malverne, New York.

Carey studied drama at the University of Miami.

Career 
Carey served in the United States Marine Corps, was wounded as part of the ship's detachment of the  during World War II, and served again in the Korean War.

Carey's acting career began in 1950.
One of his earliest roles was Lt. (jg) Bob Perry in John Wayne's Operation Pacific. Carey also made appearances in films such as I Was a Communist for the FBI (1951), This Woman Is Dangerous with Joan Crawford (1952), The Nebraskan (1953), Calamity Jane with Doris Day (1953), They Rode West (1954), Pushover (1954), Mister Roberts (1955), The Long Gray Line (1955), Port Afrique with Pier Angeli (1956), and Monstroid (1979).

In 1956, Carey starred on the NBC series Tales of the 77th Bengal Lancers. Carey's character was portrayed as Canadian because Carey reportedly could not master a British accent. He played the character Dr. Simon Battle, gunfighter turned doctor in the outstanding 1961 episode of The Rifleman "Death Trap". In 1961, he guest-starred in an episode of The Asphalt Jungle.

In a following 1962 episode, "Johnny Brassbuttons", Carey plays Marshal Frank Nolan assigned to bring back to justice a Native Indian accused of conspiracy to commit murder.

Carey had played Custer himself in The Great Sioux Massacre (1965) and played Captain Myles Keogh at the Battle of the Little Big Horn in Walt Disney's Tonka in 1959.

During this period, Carey also appeared on CBS-TV hit sitcom The Lucy Show. The episode entitled "Lucy and the Runaway Butterfly" was broadcast on April 22, 1963. In that installment, Carey played Howard McClay, a boyfriend of Lucy Carmichael's (played by Lucille Ball).

In 1971, Carey guest-starred on the landmark fifth installment of All in the Family, playing Steve, an ex–professional football player friend of Archie Bunker's, who tells Archie he is gay. The episode was entitled "Judging Books by Covers".

He also appeared in the low-budget horror film Monstroid in 1980.

Carey became well known for a series of tongue-in-cheek television commercials for Granny Goose potato chips, in which he self-identified as "Granny Goose", portraying the company's spokesperson as a tough cowboy.

A lifelong smoker, Carey was diagnosed with lung cancer in January 2006, and underwent chemotherapy.

In late March 2007, he was announced to be leaving One Life to Live. He had appeared in one episode in 2003 and one episode of All My Children in 2004. He appeared in an additional nine episodes of One Life to Live between January 3, 2007, and May 16, 2007. Carey turned down an offer to go to recurring status with the show (although he nevertheless did, in fact, make several appearances on the show after his official exit in late 2007, including several appearances in July 2008, with his final appearance having been on December 29, 2008).

Personal life
In 1949, Carey married Maureen Peppler. They had three children, Jeff, Linda, and Lisa. The marriage ended in a divorce. In 1976, Carey married Colleen Welch. They have two children, Sean and Shannon.

Carey was close friends with his on-screen sons, Clint Ritchie and Robert S. Woods.

Death 
On February 6, 2009, Carey died of lung cancer at age 83.

Filmography

 Three Husbands (1950) as Officer McCarthy (uncredited)
 Operation Pacific (1951) as Lt. (j.g.) Bob Perry
 I Was a Communist for the FBI (1951) as Mason
 Inside the Walls of Folsom Prison (1951) as Red Pardue
 Tomorrow Is Another Day (1951) as Radio Announcer (voice, uncredited)
 Force of Arms (1951) as Military Police Sgt. Fred Miller (uncredited)
 The Tanks Are Coming (1951) as Lieutenant Rawson
 This Woman Is Dangerous (1952) as Will Jackson
 Cattle Town (1952) as Ben Curran
 Springfield Rifle (1952) as Capt. Edward Tennick
 Operation Secret (1952) as Captain Johnson / Radio Announcer (voice, uncredited)
 The Man Behind the Gun (1953) as Capt. Roy Giles
 The System (1953) as Radio Broadcaster (voice, uncredited)
 Gun Fury (1953) as Frank Slayton 
 Calamity Jane (1953) as Lieutenant Danny Gilmartin
 The Nebraskan (1953) as Wade Harper
 Massacre Canyon (1954) as Lieutenant Richard Faraday
 The Outlaw Stallion (1954) as 'Doc' Woodrow 
 Pushover (1954) as Rick McAllister 
 They Rode West (1954) as Capt. Peter Blake
 Wyoming Renegades (1955) as Brady Sutton 
 The Long Gray Line (1955) as Charles 'Chuck' Dotson
 Mister Roberts (1955) as Mannion 
 Count Three and Pray (1955) as Albert Loomis
 Three Stripes in the Sun (1955) as Col. William Shepherd 
 Port Afrique (1956) as Rip Reardon  
 Wicked As They Come (1956) as Tim O'Bannion 
 The Shadow on the Window (1957) as Detective Sgt. Tony Atlas 
 Return to Warbow (1958) as Clay Hollister 
 Screaming Mimi (1958) as Bill Sweeney
 Tonka (1958) as Capt. Miles Keogh
 The Trunk (1961) as Stephen Dorning
 Cheyenne (1962) as Marshal Frank Nolan 
 Black Gold (1962) as Frank McCandless
 FBI Code 98 as Inspector Leroy Gifford
 Dead Ringer (1964) as Sergeant Hoag
 The Time Travelers (1964) as Steve Connors
 Town Tamer (1965) as Jim Akins
 The Great Sioux Massacre (1965) as Colonel Custer
 Three Guns for Texas (1968) as Capt. Edward A. Parmalee (1965 episodes of Laredo turned into a film)
 Once You Kiss a Stranger (1969) as Mike
 The Rebel Rousers (1970) as Rebel
 The Seven Minutes (1971) as Elmo Duncan
 Scream of the Wolf (1974) as Sheriff Vernon Bell
 Fighting Mad (1976) as Pierce Crabtree
 Monstroid (1980) as Barnes

References

External links

 
 Obituary in the Star Gazette

1925 births
2009 deaths
American male film actors
American male soap opera actors
American male television actors
Deaths from lung cancer in New York (state)
Male actors from Los Angeles
Actors from Hackensack, New Jersey
United States Marines
20th-century American male actors
People from Malverne, New York
People from Rosedale, Queens
United States Marine Corps personnel of World War II
United States Marine Corps personnel of the Korean War